Ramshead Publishing is an American game company that produces role-playing games and game supplements.

History
Mike Holmes and Ralph Mazza were members of the Gaming Outpost and later, founding members of the Forge who began developing their ideas into a game called Universalis: The Game of Unlimited Stories. Universalis (2002), by Holmes and Mazza, was published by Ramshead Publishing.   The company's name was based on Mazza's initials, which he had been using since childhood. In January 2003, Mazza bought out Holmes's share of Universalis, and afterward the game and Ramshead Publishing belonged to Mazza alone. In 2004 Ramshead released what Mazza called the Robots & Rapiers Quick Start Rules (2004) — first as a PDF file, then as a printed book at Gen Con Indy 2004. Adept Press, Burning Wheel, Driftwood Publishing, and Ramshead Publishing sponsored the Forge booth at Gen Con in 2004. Ramshead's second complete game, Blood Red Sands (2013), finally went out to backers as a PDF in May 2013 after a successful Kickstarter in 2012, with a print book appearing in wider distribution in early 2014.

References

Role-playing game publishing companies